Lawrence Apalara Fabunmi is a Nigerian scholar and diplomat. He is a former ambassador to Turkey, Zambia and to Poland. Fabunmi was also the pioneer director of the Nigerian Institute of International Affairs, the institute among other things is known for being a source of foreign ministry personnel, including the immediate past minister for foreign affairs, Joy Ogwu.

Works
 (PhD thesis, republished as book in 1960 by Longman)

References

Year of birth missing (living people)
Living people
Alumni of the London School of Economics
Yoruba politicians
Nigerian diplomats
High Commissioners of Nigeria to Zambia
Ambassadors of Nigeria to Turkey
Ambassadors of Nigeria to Poland